The 12th European Film Awards were presented on December 4, 1999, in Berlin, Germany. The winners were selected by the members of the European Film Academy.

Awards

Best Film

References

External links 
 European Film Academy Archive

1999 film awards
European Film Awards ceremonies
1999 in Germany
1999 in Europe